Nocturno is the third Indonesian-language studio album by Anggun. The album was released in 1992 under label Harpa Records. The album spawned hit singles such as "Problema Cinta" and "Sentuhan Dewata". The album was re-issued by Bravo Musik in 2015 with three additional tracks.

Track listing

References

1992 albums
Anggun albums
Indonesian-language albums